Jubilee Edition is a limited edition 25-disc CD box set released by Klaus Schulze in 1997 containing unreleased archival recordings in addition to new studio material. This set was wholly included in Schulze's 50-disc CD box set The Ultimate Edition released in 2000 (disc 2 was slightly remastered and discs 19 and 21 were restructured). Beginning in 2009, tracks from this set were reissued  as La Vie Electronique, a series of 3-disc CD sets releasing all the material of The Ultimate Edition in chronological order.

Track listing

Disc 1: Tradition & Vision (Disc 21 of The Ultimate Edition)

Disc 2: Avec Arthur (Disc 22 of The Ultimate Edition)

Disc 3: Budapest (Disc 23 of The Ultimate Edition)

Disc 4: Borrowed Time (Disc 24 of The Ultimate Edition)

Disc 5: Opera Trance (Disc 25 of The Ultimate Edition)

Disc 6: Real Colours (Disc 26 of The Ultimate Edition)

Disc 7: Cyborgs Faust (Disc 27 of The Ultimate Edition)

Disc 8: Vie de Rêve (Disc 28 of The Ultimate Edition)

Disc 9: Der Welt Lauf (Disc 29 of The Ultimate Edition)

Disc 10: Die Kunst (Disc 30 of The Ultimate Edition)

Disc 11: Olé! (Disc 31 of The Ultimate Edition)

Disc 12: Titanensee (Disc 32 of The Ultimate Edition)

Disc 13: Angry Moog (Disc 33 of The Ultimate Edition)

Disc 14: Die Erde ist Rund (Disc 34 of The Ultimate Edition)

Disc 15: Deutsch (Disc 35 of The Ultimate Edition)

Disc 16: Unplugged (Disc 36 of The Ultimate Edition)

Disc 17: Mostly Bruxelles (Disc 37 of The Ultimate Edition)

Disc 18: À La Mode? (Disc 38 of The Ultimate Edition)

Disc 19: New Style 

Disc 20: Interessant (Disc 39 of The Ultimate Edition)

Disc 21: Walk the Edge

Disc 22: Höchamtliche Sounds (Disc 43 of The Ultimate Edition)

Disc 23: Planetarium London (Disc 44 of The Ultimate Edition)

Disc 24: Stahlsinfonie (Disc 40 of The Ultimate Edition)

Disc 25: 'Nuff Said!  (Disc 45 of The Ultimate Edition)

See also
Silver Edition
Historic Edition
Contemporary Works I
Contemporary Works II

References

External links
Jubilee Edition at the official site of Klaus Schulze

Klaus Schulze albums